In the Skies is an album by British blues rock musician Peter Green, who was the founder of Fleetwood Mac and a member from 1967–70. Released in 1979, this was his second solo album and the first after eight years of obscurity.

Accompanying Green on this album were several experienced session musicians, including Snowy White, who went on to work with Pink Floyd before joining Thin Lizzy.  White contributed some of the lead guitar work on the album since Green was not yet fully comfortable with his return to recording after his long break.  Also present was Green's colleague and friend from his earliest bands, Peter Bardens of Camel.

All tracks were written by Peter Green, with some of the lyrics written by Green's then-wife Jane.

Rehearsal versions of "In the Skies" and "Slabo Day" were released on Snowy White's Goldtop compilation album in 1996.

A single version of "Apostle" b/w "Tribal Dance" was released in June 1978, prior to the issue of the album. The single issue was quickly withdrawn from sale.  Both tracks were re-recorded for the album.

Track listing
 "In the Skies" (Peter Green, Jane Green) – 3:52
 "Slabo Day" (P. Green, Snowy White, Reg Isidore, Lennox Langton, Peter Bardens, Kuma Harada) – 5:12
 "A Fool No More" (P. Green) – 7:46
 "Tribal Dance" (P. Green, White, Isidore, Langton) – 4:29
 "Seven Stars" (P. Green, J. Green) – 3:10
 "Funky Chunk" (P. Green, White, Isidore, Langton, Bardens, Harada) – 4:16
 "Just for You" (P. Green, J. Green, White, Isidore) – 4:39
 "Proud Pinto" (P. Green) – 3:42
 "Apostle" (P. Green) – 3:12
Recorded at Lansdowne, Morgan, Vineyard, Ramport and Advision Studios, England

2022 CD Reissue Bonus Tracks
 "Apostle" (Single Version) – 3:55 
 "Tribal Dance" (Single Version) – 4:42 
 "Slabo Day" (Rehearsal Version) – 4:39 
 "In the Skies" (Rehearsal Version) – 4:12

Personnel

Musicians
 Peter Green – vocals, lead guitar (tracks 1, 3-9), rhythm guitar (tracks 1, 2, 5, 8)
 Snowy White – rhythm guitar (tracks 3-4, 6-7, 9), lead guitar (tracks 1, 2)
 Peter Bardens – keyboards, Hammond organ, electric piano, (tracks 1-2)
 Kuma Harada – bass guitar, (tracks 1-8)
 Reg Isidore – drums, (tracks 1-7)
 Lennox Langton – percussion, congas, bongos, timbales, (tracks 1, 4, 7-8)
 Godfrey Maclean – drums, (track 8)

Technical
 Peter Vernon-Kell – producer
 Neil Hornby - Mixing at Ramport
 Dave Crawford – mastering
 Susan Marsh – design
 Josiah Spaulding, Jr., Peter Cormack – cover concept

Chart performance

References

Peter Green (musician) albums
1979 albums
Albums recorded at Morgan Sound Studios